The 1998 Four Nations Tournament was the first edition of this invitational women's football tournament held in China with four national teams participating in a round robin format. It was held from January 18 to 24, 1998, in the city of Guangzhou.

Final standings

Match results

References

1998 in women's association football
1998
1998 in Chinese football
1998 in American women's soccer
1998 in Norwegian women's football
1998 in Swedish women's football
January 1998 sports events in Asia
1998 in Chinese women's sport
Sports competitions in Guangzhou